Mississippi was admitted to the Union on December 10, 1817, and elects senators to Class 1 and Class 2. Its current senators are Republicans Cindy Hyde-Smith and Roger Wicker.  As of February 2022, 51 people have served as U.S. senators from Mississippi. John C. Stennis was Mississippi's longest-serving senator (1947–1989).

Mississippi last elected a Democrat in 1982, and both seats have been occupied by the Republicans since 1989.

List of senators

|- style="height:2em"
! rowspan=2 | 1
| rowspan=2 align=left | Walter Leake
| rowspan=2  | Democratic-Republican
| rowspan=2 nowrap | Dec 10, 1817 –May 15, 1820
| rowspan=2 | Elected in 1817.Resigned.
| rowspan=4 | 1
| 
| rowspan=5 | 1
| rowspan=5 | Elected in 1817.
| rowspan=11 nowrap | Dec 10, 1817 –Mar 3, 1829
| rowspan=6  | Democratic-Republican
| rowspan=11 align=right | Thomas Hill Williams
! rowspan=11 | 1

|- style="height:2em"
| 

|- style="height:2em"
| colspan=3 | Vacant
| nowrap | May 15, 1820 –Aug 30, 1820
|  

|- style="height:2em"
! rowspan=4 | 2
| rowspan=4 align=left | David Holmes
| rowspan=3  | Democratic-Republican
| rowspan=4 nowrap | Aug 30, 1820 –Sep 25, 1825
| Elected to finish Leake's term.

|- style="height:2em"
| rowspan=3 | Re-election year unknown.Resigned to become Governor of Mississippi.
| rowspan=6 | 2
| 

|- style="height:2em"
| 
| rowspan=6 | 2
| rowspan=6 | Re-elected in 1823.

|- style="height:2em"
|  | Jacksonian
| 
| rowspan=5  | Jacksonian

|- style="height:2em"
| colspan=3 | Vacant
| nowrap | Sep 25, 1825 –Sep 28, 1825
|  

|- style="height:2em"
! 3
| align=left | Powhatan Ellis
|  | Jacksonian
| nowrap | Sep 28, 1825 –Jan 28, 1826
| Appointed to continue Holmes's term.Lost election to finish Holmes's term.

|- style="height:2em"
! 4
| align=left | Thomas Buck Reed
|  | Jacksonian
| nowrap | Jan 28, 1826 –Mar 3, 1827
| Elected to finish Holmes's term.Lost election to full term.

|- style="height:2em"
! rowspan=7 | 5
| rowspan=7 align=left | Powhatan Ellis
| rowspan=7  | Jacksonian
| rowspan=7 nowrap | Mar 4, 1827 –Jul 16, 1832
| rowspan=7 | Election year unknown.Resigned to become a U.S. District Judge.
| rowspan=9 | 3
| 

|- style="height:2em"
| 
| rowspan=10 | 3
| Elected in 1828.Died.
| nowrap | Mar 4, 1829 –Nov 26, 1829
|  | Jacksonian
| align=right | Thomas Buck Reed
! 2

|- style="height:2em"
|  
| nowrap | Nov 26, 1829 –Jan 6, 1830
| colspan=3 | Vacant

|- style="height:2em"
| Elected to finish Reed's term.Died.
| nowrap | Jan 6, 1830 –Jul 2, 1830
|  | Jacksonian
| align=right | Robert H. Adams
! 3

|- style="height:2em"
|  
| nowrap | Jul 2, 1830 –Oct 15, 1830
| colspan=3 | Vacant

|- style="height:2em"
| rowspan=6 | Appointed to continue Adams's term.Elected in 1830 to finish Adams's term.Lost re-election.
| rowspan=6 nowrap | Oct 15, 1830 –Mar 3, 1835
|  | Jacksonian
| rowspan=6 align=right | George Poindexter
! rowspan=6 | 4

|- style="height:2em"
| 
| rowspan=5  | NationalRepublican

|- style="height:2em"
| colspan=3 | Vacant
| nowrap | Jul 16, 1832 –Nov 12, 1832
|  

|- style="height:2em"
! rowspan=5 | 6
| align=left | John Black
|  | Jacksonian
| nowrap | Nov 12, 1832 –Mar 3, 1833
| Appointed to finish Ellis's term.

|- style="height:2em"
| colspan=2 | Vacant
| nowrap | Mar 3, 1833 –Nov 22, 1833
| Legislature failed to elect.
| rowspan=7 | 4
| 

|- style="height:2em"
| rowspan=3 align=left | John Black
| rowspan=2  | NationalRepublican
| rowspan=3 nowrap | Nov 22, 1833 –Jan 22, 1838
| rowspan=3 | Elected late.Resigned.

|- style="height:2em"
| 
| rowspan=6 | 4
| rowspan=6 | Elected in 1835.
| rowspan=9 nowrap | Mar 4, 1835 –Mar 5, 1845
|  | Jacksonian
| rowspan=9 align=right | Robert J. Walker
! rowspan=9 | 5

|- style="height:2em"
|  | Whig
| 
| rowspan=8  | Democratic

|- style="height:2em"
! 7
| align=left | James F. Trotter
|  | Democratic
| nowrap | Jan 22, 1838 –Jul 10, 1838
| Appointed to continue Black's term.Resigned.

|- style="height:2em"
| colspan=3 | Vacant
| nowrap | Jul 10, 1838 –Nov 12, 1838
|  

|- style="height:2em"
! 8
| align=left |  Thomas Hickman Williams
|  | Democratic
| nowrap | Nov 12, 1838 –Mar 3, 1839
| Appointed to continue Black's term.Elected in 1839 to finish Black's term..

|- style="height:2em"
! rowspan=3 | 9
| rowspan=3 align=left | John Henderson
| rowspan=3  | Whig
| rowspan=3 nowrap | Mar 4, 1839 –Mar 3, 1845
| rowspan=3 | Elected in 1838..
| rowspan=3 | 5
| 

|- style="height:2em"
| 
| rowspan=5 | 5
| rowspan=3 | Re-elected in 1841.Resigned to become U.S. Secretary of the Treasury.

|- style="height:2em"
| 

|- style="height:2em"
! rowspan=4 | 10
| rowspan=4 align=left | Jesse Speight
| rowspan=4  | Democratic
| rowspan=4 nowrap | Mar 4, 1845 –May 1, 1847
| rowspan=4 | Elected in 1844.Died.
| rowspan=7 | 6
| 

|- style="height:2em"
|  
| nowrap | Mar 5, 1845 –Nov 3, 1845
| colspan=3 | Vacant

|- style="height:2em"
| Appointed to continue Walker's term.Elected in 1846 to finish Walker's term..
| nowrap | Nov 3, 1845 –Mar 3, 1847
|  | Democratic
| align=right | Joseph W. Chalmers
! 6

|- style="height:2em"
| 
| rowspan=10 | 6
| rowspan=7 | Elected in 1846 or 1847.Resigned to become Governor of Mississippi.
| rowspan=7 nowrap | Mar 4, 1847 –Jan 8, 1852
| rowspan=7  | Democratic
| rowspan=7 align=right | Henry S. Foote
! rowspan=7 | 7

|- style="height:2em"
| colspan=3 | Vacant
| nowrap | May 1, 1847 –Aug 10, 1847
|  

|- style="height:2em"
! rowspan=3 | 11
| rowspan=3 align=left | Jefferson Davis
| rowspan=3  | Democratic
| rowspan=3 nowrap | Aug 10, 1847 –Sep 23, 1851
| rowspan=2 | Appointed to continue Speight's term.Elected in 1848 to finish Speight's term.

|- style="height:2em"
| 

|- style="height:2em"
| Re-elected in 1850.Resigned to run for Governor of Mississippi.
| rowspan=9 | 7
| 

|- style="height:2em"
| colspan=3 | Vacant
| nowrap | Sep 23, 1851 –Dec 1, 1851
|  

|- style="height:2em"
! rowspan=3 | 12
| rowspan=3 align=left | John J. McRae
| rowspan=3  | Democratic
| rowspan=3 nowrap | Dec 1, 1851 –Mar 17, 1852
| rowspan=3 | Appointed to continue Davis's term.Successor elected.

|- style="height:2em"
|  
| nowrap | Jan 8, 1852 –Feb 18, 1852
| colspan=3 | Vacant

|- style="height:2em"
| rowspan=2 | Elected to finish Foote's term.Retired.
| rowspan=2 nowrap | Feb 18, 1852 –Mar 3, 1853
| rowspan=2  | Whig
| rowspan=2 align=right | Walker Brooke
! rowspan=2 | 8

|- style="height:2em"
! rowspan=4 | 13
| rowspan=4 align=left | Stephen Adams
| rowspan=4  | Democratic
| rowspan=4 nowrap | Mar 17, 1852 –Mar 3, 1857
| rowspan=4 | Elected to finish Davis's term..

|- style="height:2em"
| 
| rowspan=4 | 7
|  
| nowrap | Mar 4, 1853 –Jan 7, 1854
| colspan=3 | Vacant

|- style="height:2em"
| rowspan=3 | Elected late in 1854
| rowspan=4 nowrap | Jan 7, 1854 –Jan 12, 1861
| rowspan=4  | Democratic
| rowspan=4 align=right | Albert G. Brown
! rowspan=4 | 9

|- style="height:2em"
| 

|- style="height:2em"
! rowspan=3 | 14
| rowspan=3 align=left | Jefferson Davis
| rowspan=3  | Democratic
| rowspan=3 nowrap | Mar 4, 1857 –Jan 21, 1861
| rowspan=3 | Elected in 1856 or 1857.Resigned.
| rowspan=5 | 8
| 

|- style="height:2em"
| 
| rowspan=5 | 8
| Re-elected in 1859.Withdrew.

|- style="height:2em"
| rowspan=7 | Civil War and Reconstruction
| rowspan=7 nowrap | Jan 12, 1861 –Feb 23, 1870
| rowspan=7 colspan=3 | Vacant

|- style="height:2em"
| rowspan=6 colspan=3 | Vacant
| rowspan=6 nowrap | Jan 21, 1861 –Feb 23, 1870
| rowspan=6 | Civil War and Reconstruction

|- style="height:2em"
| 

|- style="height:2em"
| rowspan=3 | 9
| 

|- style="height:2em"
| 
| rowspan=4 | 9

|- style="height:2em"
| 

|- style="height:2em"
| rowspan=6 | 10
| 

|- style="height:2em"
! rowspan=4 | 15
| rowspan=4 align=left | Adelbert Ames
| rowspan=4  | Republican
| rowspan=4 nowrap | Feb 23, 1870 –Jan 4, 1874
| rowspan=4 | Elected in 1870 upon readmission.Resigned to become Governor of Mississippi.
| Elected in 1870 upon readmission..
| nowrap | Feb 23, 1870 –Mar 3, 1871
|  | Republican
| align=right | Hiram Rhodes Revels
! 10

|- style="height:2em"
| 
| rowspan=6 | 10
|  
| nowrap | Mar 3, 1871 –Dec 1, 1871
| colspan=3 | Vacant

|- style="height:2em"
| rowspan=5 | Elected in 1870, but remained Governor until Dec 1871..
| rowspan=5 nowrap | Dec 1, 1871 –Mar 3, 1877
| rowspan=5  | Republican
| rowspan=5 align=right | James L. Alcorn
! rowspan=5 | 11

|- style="height:2em"
| 

|- style="height:2em"
| colspan=3 | Vacant
| nowrap | Jan 4, 1874 –Feb 3, 1874
|  

|- style="height:2em"
! 16
| align=left | Henry R. Pease
|  | Republican
| nowrap | Feb 3, 1874 –Mar 3, 1875
| Elected to finish Ames's term.Retired.
|  

|- style="height:2em"
! rowspan=3 | 17
| rowspan=3 align=left | Blanche Bruce
| rowspan=3  | Republican
| rowspan=3 nowrap | Mar 4, 1875 –Mar 3, 1881
| rowspan=3 | Elected in 1874..
| rowspan=3 | 11
| 

|- style="height:2em"
| 
| rowspan=3 | 11
| rowspan=3 | Elected in 1876.
| rowspan=5 nowrap | Mar 4, 1877 –Mar 6, 1885
| rowspan=5  | Democratic
| rowspan=5 align=right | Lucius Q. C. Lamar
! rowspan=5 | 12

|- style="height:2em"
| 

|- style="height:2em"
! rowspan=13 | 18
| rowspan=13 align=left | James Z. George
| rowspan=13  | Democratic
| rowspan=13 nowrap | Mar 4, 1881 –Aug 14, 1897
| rowspan=5 | Elected in 1880.
| rowspan=5 | 12
| 

|- style="height:2em"
| 
| rowspan=5 | 12
| rowspan=2 | Re-elected in 1883.Resigned.

|- style="height:2em"
| 

|- style="height:2em"
|  
| nowrap | Mar 6, 1885 –Mar 9, 1885
| colspan=3 | Vacant

|- style="height:2em"
| rowspan=2 | Appointed to continue Lamar's term.Elected in 1886 to finish Lamar's term.
| rowspan=5 nowrap | Mar 9, 1885 –Jan 24, 1894
| rowspan=5  | Democratic
| rowspan=5 align=right | Edward C. Walthall
! rowspan=5 | 13

|- style="height:2em"
| rowspan=3 | Re-elected in 1886.
| rowspan=3 | 13
| 

|- style="height:2em"
| 
| rowspan=5 | 13
| rowspan=3 | Re-elected in 1889.Resigned.

|- style="height:2em"
| 

|- style="height:2em"
| rowspan=5 | Re-elected in 1892.Died.
| rowspan=9 | 14
| 

|- style="height:2em"
|  
| nowrap | Jan 24, 1894 –Feb 7, 1894
| colspan=3 | Vacant

|- style="height:2em"
| Elected to finish Walthall's term..
| nowrap | Feb 7, 1894 –Mar 3, 1895
|  | Democratic
| align=right | Anselm J. McLaurin
! 14

|- style="height:2em"
| 
| rowspan=7 | 14
| rowspan=4 | Elected early in 1892.Died.
| rowspan=4 nowrap | Mar 4, 1895 –Apr 21, 1898
| rowspan=4  | Democratic
| rowspan=4 align=right | Edward C. Walthall
! rowspan=4 | 15

|- style="height:2em"
| 

|- style="height:2em"
| colspan=3 | Vacant
| nowrap | Aug 14, 1897 –Oct 8, 1897
|  

|- style="height:2em"
! rowspan=12 | 19
| rowspan=12 align=left | Hernando Money
| rowspan=12  | Democratic
| rowspan=12 nowrap | Oct 8, 1897 –Mar 3, 1911
| rowspan=3 | Appointed to finish George's term.

|- style="height:2em"
|  
| nowrap | Apr 21, 1898 –May 31, 1898
| colspan=3 | Vacant

|- style="height:2em"
| rowspan=2 | Appointed to continue Walthall's term.Elected in 1900 to finish Walthall's term.Retired.
| rowspan=2 nowrap | May 31, 1898 –Mar 3, 1901
| rowspan=2  | Democratic
| rowspan=2 align=right | William V. Sullivan
! rowspan=2 | 16

|- style="height:2em"
| rowspan=3 | Elected to full term in 1899.
| rowspan=3 | 15
| 

|- style="height:2em"
| 
| rowspan=3 | 15
| rowspan=3 | Elected in 1900.
| rowspan=5 nowrap | Mar 4, 1901 –Dec 22, 1909
| rowspan=5  | Democratic
| rowspan=5 align=right | Anselm J. McLaurin
! rowspan=5 | 17

|- style="height:2em"
| 

|- style="height:2em"
| rowspan=6 | Re-elected in 1904.Retired.
| rowspan=6 | 16
| 

|- style="height:2em"
| 
| rowspan=6 | 16
| rowspan=2 | Re-elected early in 1904.Died.

|- style="height:2em"
| 

|- style="height:2em"
|  
| nowrap | Dec 22, 1909 –Dec 27, 1909
| colspan=3 | Vacant

|- style="height:2em"
| Appointed to continue McLaurin's term.Successor qualified.
| nowrap | Dec 27, 1909 –Feb 22, 1910
|  | Democratic
| align=right | James Gordon
! 18

|- style="height:2em"
| rowspan=2 | Elected to finish McLaurin's term.Lost nomination to full term.
| rowspan=2 nowrap | Feb 23, 1910 –Mar 3, 1913
| rowspan=2  | Democratic
| rowspan=2 align=right | LeRoy Percy
! rowspan=2 | 19

|- style="height:2em"
! rowspan=6 | 20
| rowspan=6 align=left | John Sharp Williams
| rowspan=6  | Democratic
| rowspan=6 nowrap | Mar 4, 1911 –Mar 3, 1923
| rowspan=3 | Elected early in 1908.
| rowspan=3 | 17
| 

|- style="height:2em"
| 
| rowspan=3 | 17
| rowspan=3 | Elected in 1912.Lost renomination.
| rowspan=3 nowrap | Mar 4, 1913 –Mar 3, 1919
| rowspan=3  | Democratic
| rowspan=3 align=right | James K. Vardaman
! rowspan=3 | 20

|- style="height:2em"
| 

|- style="height:2em"
| rowspan=3 | Re-elected in 1916.Retired.
| rowspan=3 | 18
| 

|- style="height:2em"
| 
| rowspan=3 | 18
| rowspan=3 | Elected in 1918.
| rowspan=12 nowrap | Mar 5, 1919 –Jun 22, 1941
| rowspan=12  | Democratic
| rowspan=12 align=right | Pat Harrison
! rowspan=12 | 21

|- style="height:2em"
| 

|- style="height:2em"
! rowspan=6 | 21
| rowspan=6 align=left | Hubert D. Stephens
| rowspan=6  | Democratic
| rowspan=6 nowrap | Mar 4, 1923 –Jan 3, 1935
| rowspan=3 | Elected in 1922.
| rowspan=3 | 19
| 

|- style="height:2em"
| 
| rowspan=3 | 19
| rowspan=3 | Re-elected in 1924.

|- style="height:2em"
| 

|- style="height:2em"
| rowspan=3 | Re-elected in 1928.Lost renomination.
| rowspan=3 | 20
| 

|- style="height:2em"
| 
| rowspan=3 | 20
| rowspan=3 | Re-elected in 1930.

|- style="height:2em"
| 

|- style="height:2em"
! rowspan=10 | 22
| rowspan=10 align=left | Theodore G. Bilbo
| rowspan=10  | Democratic
| rowspan=10 nowrap | Jan 3, 1935 –Aug 21, 1947
| rowspan=3 | Elected in 1934.
| rowspan=3 | 21
| 

|- style="height:2em"
| 
| rowspan=6 | 21
| rowspan=3 | Re-elected in 1936.Died.

|- style="height:2em"
| 

|- style="height:2em"
| rowspan=6 | Re-elected in 1940.
| rowspan=6 | 22
| 

|- style="height:2em"
|  
| nowrap | Jun 22, 1941 –Jun 30, 1941
| colspan=3 | Vacant

|- style="height:2em"
| Appointed to continue Harrison's term.Retired when successor elected.
| nowrap | Jun 30, 1941 –Sep 28, 1941
|  | Democratic
| align=right | James Eastland
! 22

|- style="height:2em"
| Elected to finish Harrison's term.Lost renomination.
| nowrap | Sep 29, 1941 –Jan 3, 1943
|  | Democratic
| align=right | Wall Doxey
! 23

|- style="height:2em"
| 
| rowspan=5 | 22
| rowspan=5 | Elected in 1942.
| rowspan=20 nowrap | Jan 3, 1943 –Dec 27, 1978
| rowspan=20  | Democratic
| rowspan=20 align=right | James Eastland
! rowspan=20 | 24

|- style="height:2em"
| 

|- style="height:2em"
| Re-elected in 1946.Died.
| rowspan=5 | 23
| 

|- style="height:2em"
| colspan=3 | Vacant
| nowrap | Aug 21, 1947 –Nov 5, 1947
|  

|- style="height:2em"
! rowspan=22 | 23
| rowspan=22 align=left | John C. Stennis
| rowspan=22  | Democratic
| rowspan=22 nowrap | Nov 5, 1947 –Jan 3, 1989
| rowspan=3 | Elected to finish Bilbo's term.

|- style="height:2em"
| 
| rowspan=3 | 23
| rowspan=3 | Re-elected in 1948.

|- style="height:2em"
| 

|- style="height:2em"
| rowspan=3 | Re-elected in 1952.
| rowspan=3 | 24
| 

|- style="height:2em"
| 
| rowspan=3 | 24
| rowspan=3 | Re-elected in 1954.

|- style="height:2em"
| 

|- style="height:2em"
| rowspan=3 | Re-elected in 1958.
| rowspan=3 | 25
| 

|- style="height:2em"
| 
| rowspan=3 | 25
| rowspan=3 | Re-elected in 1960.

|- style="height:2em"
| 

|- style="height:2em"
| rowspan=3 | Re-elected in 1964.
| rowspan=3 | 26
| 

|- style="height:2em"
| 
| rowspan=3 | 26
| rowspan=3 | Re-elected in 1966.

|- style="height:2em"
| 

|- style="height:2em"
| rowspan=3 | Re-elected in 1970.
| rowspan=3 | 27
| 

|- style="height:2em"
| 
| rowspan=4 | 27
| rowspan=3 | Re-elected in 1972.Retired, and resigned early to give successor preferential seniority.

|- style="height:2em"
| 

|- style="height:2em"
| rowspan=4 | Re-elected in 1976.
| rowspan=4 | 28
| 

|- style="height:2em"
| Appointed early to finish Eastland's term, having already been elected to the next term.
| rowspan=23 nowrap | Dec 27, 1978 –Apr 1, 2018
| rowspan=23  | Republican
| rowspan=23 align=right | Thad Cochran
! rowspan=23 | 25

|- style="height:2em"
| 
| rowspan=3 | 28
| rowspan=3 | Elected in 1978.

|- style="height:2em"
| 

|- style="height:2em"
| rowspan=3 | Re-elected in 1982.Retired.
| rowspan=3 | 29
| 

|- style="height:2em"
| 
| rowspan=3 | 29
| rowspan=3 | Re-elected in 1984.

|- style="height:2em"
| 

|- style="height:2em"
! rowspan=10 | 24
| rowspan=10 align=left | Trent Lott
| rowspan=10  | Republican
| rowspan=10 nowrap | Jan 3, 1989 –Dec 18, 2007
| rowspan=3 | Elected in 1988.
| rowspan=3 | 30
| 

|- style="height:2em"
| 
| rowspan=3 | 30
| rowspan=3 | Re-elected in 1990.

|- style="height:2em"
| 

|- style="height:2em"
| rowspan=3 | Re-elected in 1994.
| rowspan=3 | 31
| 

|- style="height:2em"
| 
| rowspan=3 | 31
| rowspan=3 | Re-elected in 1996.

|- style="height:2em"
| 

|- style="height:2em"
| rowspan=3 | Re-elected in 2000.
| rowspan=3 | 32
| 

|- style="height:2em"
| 
| rowspan=5 | 32
| rowspan=5 | Re-elected in 2002.

|- style="height:2em"
| 

|- style="height:2em"
| Re-elected in 2006.Resigned.
| rowspan=5 | 33
| 

|- style="height:2em"
| colspan=3 | Vacant
| nowrap | Dec 18, 2007 –Dec 31, 2007
|  

|- style="height:2em"
! rowspan=11 | 25
| rowspan=11 align=left | Roger Wicker
| rowspan=11  | Republican
| rowspan=11 nowrap | Dec 31, 2007 –Present
| rowspan=3 | Appointed to continue Lott's term.Elected in 2008 to finish Lott's term.

|- style="height:2em"
| 
| rowspan=3 | 33
| rowspan=3 | Re-elected in 2008.

|- style="height:2em"
| 

|- style="height:2em"
| rowspan=5 | Re-elected in 2012.
| rowspan=5 | 34
| 

|- style="height:2em"
| 
| rowspan=5 | 34
| rowspan=2 | Re-elected in 2014.Resigned.

|- style="height:2em"
| rowspan=3 

|- style="height:2em"
|  
| nowrap | Apr 1, 2018 –Apr 9, 2018
| colspan=3 | Vacant

|- style="height:2em"
| rowspan=2 | Appointed to continue Cochran's term.Elected in 2018 in runoff election to finish Cochran's term.
| rowspan=5 nowrap | Apr 9, 2018 –Present
| rowspan=5  | Republican
| rowspan=5 align=right | Cindy Hyde-Smith
! rowspan=5 | 26

|- style="height:2em"
| rowspan=3 | Re-elected in 2018.
| rowspan=3 | 35
| 

|- style="height:2em"
| 
| rowspan=3 | 35
| rowspan=3  | Re-elected in 2020.

|- style="height:2em"
| 

|- style="height:2em"
| rowspan=2 colspan=5 | To be determined in the 2024 election.
| rowspan=2|36
| 

|- style="height:2em"
| 
| 36
| colspan=5 | To be determined in the 2026 election.

See also

 List of United States representatives from Mississippi
 United States congressional delegations from Mississippi
 Elections in Mississippi

Notes

References 
 

 
United States senators
Mississippi